Axel Jacob Petersson (1834–15 January 1884) was a Swedish-Norwegian structural engineer and inventor. He is most noted for his work with railway bridges and viaducts in Norway from the 1860s through the 1870s, as well as developing the Krag–Petersson rifle.

Biography

Petersson was born in Öland in 1834. He studied at the Royal Institute of Technology in Stockholm between 1852 and 1855. He worked for the Swedish Canal Administration and later for a private railway in Sweden. He moved to Norway in 1859, after he was hired as an assistant engineer for the construction of the Kongsvinger Line. By 1865 he was hired as the chief of the Railway Construction Office. He was responsible for construction of bridges and viaducts on the Østfold Line and the Dovre Line between Eidsvoll and Hamar.

By 1881 Peterson had poor health and retired. He died on 15 January 1884 in Christiania (now Oslo), Norway. There was a story that stayed around for a long time that the constructor of the Ljan Viaduct had committed suicide before its opening because he did not trust it to stand. Geir-Wider Langård has proposed that this folklore arose with the magnitude of the bridge combined with the Tay Bridge disaster in Scotland which killed 75 people when it collapsed the same year as the Ljan Viaduct opened in 1879.

Works
Some of the larger constructions were Minnesund Railway Bridge (Minnesund Jernbanebru),  Ljan Viaduct  (Ljansbroen), Hølen Viaduct (Hølen viadukt) and Sarp Bridge (Sarpsbroene). Petersson invented the pendular pillar principle, which was first applied on Hølen Viaduct.

Petersson also made a series of other inventions. He developed a rotating camera and calculating machines. He cooperated with Ole Herman Johannes Krag to develop the Krag–Petersson rifle, which was a mainstay in the Norwegian military for decades.

Bibliography
 Regler for Maskindeles Konstruktion (1866, 1877) with C. M. Guldberg
 Regler for Vandhjuls og Turbiners Konstruktion (1868) with C. M. Guldberg

References

1834 births
1884 deaths
People from Öland
Swedish engineers
Norwegian engineers
Bridge engineers
Viaduct engineers
Swedish emigrants to Norway